Boogie Nights is a 1997 American period comedy-drama film written and directed by Paul Thomas Anderson. It is set in Los Angeles's San Fernando Valley and focuses on a young nightclub dishwasher who becomes a popular star of pornographic films, chronicling his rise in the Golden Age of Porn of the 1970s through his fall during the excesses of the 1980s. The film is an expansion of Anderson's mockumentary short film The Dirk Diggler Story (1988), and stars Mark Wahlberg, Julianne Moore, Burt Reynolds, Don Cheadle, John C. Reilly, William H. Macy, Philip Seymour Hoffman, and Heather Graham.

Boogie Nights premiered at the Toronto International Film Festival on September 11, 1997, and was theatrically released on October 10, 1997, garnering critical acclaim. It was nominated for three Academy Awards, including Best Original Screenplay for Anderson, Best Supporting Actress for Moore, and Best Supporting Actor for Reynolds. The film's soundtrack also received acclaim.

Plot
In 1977, high-school dropout Eddie Adams is living with his father and emotionally abusive mother in Torrance, California. He works at a Reseda nightclub owned by Maurice Rodriguez, where he meets porn filmmaker Jack Horner. Interested in bringing Eddie into porn, Jack auditions him by watching him have sex with Rollergirl, a porn starlet who always wears skates.

After a fight with his mother, Adams moves in with Horner at his San Fernando Valley home. Adams gives himself the screen name "Dirk Diggler" and becomes a star because of his good looks, youthful charisma, and unusually large penis. His success allows him to buy a new house, an extensive wardrobe, and a "competition orange" 1977 Chevrolet Corvette. With his friend and co-star Reed Rothchild, Dirk pitches a series of successful action-themed porn films. He works and socializes with others from the porn industry, and they live carefree lifestyles in the late 1970s disco era. While attending a New Year's Eve party at Horner's house on December 31, 1979, assistant director Little Bill Thompson discovers his adulterous wife having sex with another man. Bill, tired of being repeatedly cuckolded, shoots the pair dead and commits suicide.

Dirk and Reed begin using cocaine on a regular basis. Due to his drug use, Dirk finds it increasingly difficult to achieve an erection, falls into violent mood swings, and becomes irritated with Johnny Doe, a rival leading man Jack has recently recruited, who Dirk worries about being replaced by. In 1983, after arguing with Jack, Dirk is fired and takes off with Reed to start a music career along with Scotty, a boom operator who is in love with Dirk. Jack rejects business overtures from Floyd Gondolli, a theater magnate who insists on cutting costs by shooting on videotape because Jack believes that video will diminish the quality of his films.

After his friend and financier, Colonel James, is incarcerated for causing an underage girl to overdose on cocaine, along with possession of child pornography, Jack cooperates with Gondolli but becomes disillusioned with the work he is expected to churn out. One of these projects involves Jack and Rollergirl riding in a limousine, searching for random men for her to have sex with while being taped by a crew. One man recognizes Rollergirl as a former high-school classmate, and after a failed attempt at intercourse, he insults her and Jack. Both Jack and Rollergirl attack the man, leaving him bloodied on the sidewalk.

Leading lady Amber Waves lands in a custody battle with her ex-husband. The court determines that she is an unfit mother due to her involvement in the porn industry, criminal record, and cocaine addiction. Buck Swope marries fellow porn star Jessie St. Vincent, who becomes pregnant. Because of his past as a pornographer, Buck is disqualified from a bank loan and cannot open his own stereo equipment store. That night, he finds himself in the middle of a holdup at a donut shop in which the clerk, the robber, and an armed customer are killed. Buck is the sole survivor and escapes with the money.

Having spent most of their money on drugs, Dirk and Reed are unable to pay a recording studio for demo tapes they believe will enable them to become music stars. Desperate for money, Dirk resorts to prostitution but is assaulted and robbed by three men. Dirk, Reed, and their friend Todd Parker attempt to scam local drug dealer Rahad Jackson at his estate by selling him a half-kilo of baking soda disguised as cocaine. Dirk and Reed want to leave quickly before Rahad's bodyguard inspects it, but Todd attempts to steal more drugs and money from Rahad. In the ensuing gunfight, Todd kills Rahad's bodyguard and is killed by Rahad, while Dirk and Reed narrowly escape. Dirk returns to Jack's home and they reconcile.

In 1984, Amber shoots the television commercial for the opening of Buck's store, Rollergirl takes a GED class, Colonel James remains in prison, Maurice opens a nightclub, Reed performs magic acts at a strip club, and Jessie gives birth to her and Buck's son. Dirk, Jack, and Amber prepare to start filming again.

Cast

Production

Development
Boogie Nights is based on a mockumentary short film that Anderson wrote and directed while he was still in high school called The Dirk Diggler Story. The short itself was based on the 1981 documentary Exhausted: John C. Holmes, The Real Story, a documentary about the life of legendary porn actor John Holmes, on whom Dirk Diggler is based.

Anderson originally wanted the role of Eddie to be played by Leonardo DiCaprio, after seeing him in The Basketball Diaries. DiCaprio enjoyed the screenplay, but had to turn it down because he signed on to star in Titanic. He recommended Mark Wahlberg for the role. Joaquin Phoenix was also offered the role of Eddie, but turned it down due to concerns about playing a porn star. Phoenix later collaborated with Anderson on the films The Master and Inherent Vice. Bill Murray, Harvey Keitel, Warren Beatty, Albert Brooks and Sydney Pollack declined or were passed up on the role of Jack Horner, which went to Burt Reynolds. After starring in Hard Eight, Samuel L. Jackson declined the role of Buck Swope, which went to Don Cheadle. Anderson initially did not consider Heather Graham for Rollergirl, because he had never seen her do nudity in a film. However, Graham's agent called Anderson asking if she could read for the part, which she won. Gwyneth Paltrow, Drew Barrymore and Tatum O'Neal were also up for the role.

After having a very difficult time getting his previous film, Hard Eight, released, Anderson laid down a hard law when making Boogie Nights. He initially wanted the film to be over three hours long and be rated NC-17. The film's producers, particularly Michael De Luca, said that the film had to be either under three hours or rated R. Anderson fought with them, saying that the film would not have a mainstream appeal no matter what. They did not change their minds, and Anderson chose the R rating as a challenge. Despite this, the film was still 20 minutes shorter than promised.

Reynolds did not get along with Anderson while filming. After seeing a rough cut of the film, Reynolds fired his agent for recommending it. Despite this, Reynolds won a Golden Globe Award and was nominated for an Academy Award for his performance. Later, Anderson wanted Reynolds to star in his next film, Magnolia, but Reynolds declined. In 2012, Reynolds denied rumors that he disliked the film, calling it "extraordinary" and saying that his opinion of it has nothing to do with his relationship with Anderson.

Release
The film premiered at the Toronto International Film Festival and was shown at the New York Film Festival, before opening on two screens in the U.S. on October 10, 1997. It grossed $50,168 during its opening weekend. Three weeks later, it expanded to 907 theaters and grossed $4.7 million, ranking number four for the week. It eventually earned $26.4 million in the U.S. and $16.7 million in foreign markets for a worldwide box office total of $43.1 million.

Reception

On review aggregator Rotten Tomatoes, the film holds an approval rating of 93% based on 76 reviews, with an average score of 8.10/10. The site's critical consensus states, "Grounded in strong characters, bold themes, and subtle storytelling, Boogie Nights is a groundbreaking film both for director P.T. Anderson and star Mark Wahlberg." On Metacritic, the film holds a weighted average score of 85 out of 100, based on 28 critics, indicating "universal acclaim." Audiences polled by CinemaScore gave the film an average grade of "C" on an A+ to F scale.

Janet Maslin of The New York Times wrote, "Everything about Boogie Nights is interestingly unexpected," although "the film's extravagant 2-hour 32-minute length amounts to a slight tactical mistake ... [it] has no trouble holding interest ... but the length promises larger ideas than the film finally delivers." She praised Burt Reynolds for "his best and most suavely funny performance in many years," and added, "The movie's special gift happens to be Mark Wahlberg, who gives a terrifically appealing performance."

Roger Ebert of the Chicago Sun-Times observed: 

Mick LaSalle of the San Francisco Chronicle stated, "Boogie Nights is the first great film about the 1970s to come out since the '70s ... It gets all the details right, nailing down the styles and the music. More impressive, it captures the decade's distinct, decadent glamour ... [It] also succeeds at something very difficult: re-creating the ethos and mentality of an era ... Paul Thomas Anderson ... has pulled off a wonderful, sprawling, sophisticated film ... With Boogie Nights, we know we're not just watching episodes from disparate lives but a panorama of recent social history, rendered in bold, exuberant colors."

Kenneth Turan of the Los Angeles Times called it "a startling film, but not for the obvious reasons. Yes, its decision to focus on the pornography business in the San Fernando Valley in the 1970s and 1980s is nerviness itself, but more impressive is the film's sureness of touch, its ability to be empathetic, nonjudgmental and gently satirical, to understand what is going on beneath the surface of this raunchy Nashville-esque universe and to deftly relate it to our own ... Perhaps the most exciting thing about Boogie Nights is the ease with which writer-director Anderson ... spins out this complex web. A true storyteller, able to easily mix and match moods in a playful and audacious manner, he is a filmmaker definitely worth watching, both now and in the future." In Time Out New York, Andrew Johnston concluded, "The porn milieu may scare some folks off, but Boogie Nights offers laughs, tenderness, terror and redemption--everything you could ask for in a movie. It's an impressive and satisfying film, one the Academy really ought to have the balls to recognize."

Peter Travers of Rolling Stone said, "[T]his chunk of movie dynamite is detonated by Mark Wahlberg ... who grabs a breakout role and runs with it ... Even when Boogie Nights flies off course as it tracks its bizarrely idealistic characters into the '80s ... you can sense the passionate commitment at the core of this hilarious and harrowing spectacle. For this, credit Paul Thomas Anderson ... who ... scores a personal triumph by finding glints of rude life in the ashes that remained after Watergate. For all the unbridled sex, what is significant, timely and, finally, hopeful about Boogie Nights is the way Anderson proves that a movie can be mercilessly honest and mercifully humane at the same time."

Gene Siskel of Chicago Tribune called it "beautifully made" and praised the performances, calling Reynolds "absolutely centered and in control of his emotions" and saying Wahlberg "couldn't be better". However, he moderated his praise by saying, "The early rave reviews accorded this film suggest a significance that I, however, did not encounter. Show-biz stories are all pretty much the same: ambition, stardom, drugs, disillusionment. Add the home video revolution to this mix and curiosity about the size of the boy wonder's equipment; throw in a few topical references like the soft drink Fresca, and you have the bare bones of the story." He gave the film three and a half stars out of a possible four.

Accolades

Music

Two Boogie Nights soundtracks were released, the first at the time of the film's initial release and the second the following year. AllMusic rated the first soundtrack four and a half stars out of five and the second soundtrack four.

Personnel
 Paul Thomas Anderson – executive producer
 Karyn Rachtman – executive producer, music supervisor
 Liz Heller – executive producer
 Bobby Lavelle – music supervisor
 Carol Dunn – music coordinator

Songs that appear in the film but not on the soundtrack albums 
 "Sunny" by Boney M.
 "Susan (The Sage)" by Chico Hamilton Quintet
 "Fly, Robin, Fly" by Silver Convention
 "Afternoon Delight" by Starland Vocal Band
 "Lonely Boy" by Andrew Gold
 "Fat Man" by Jethro Tull
 "Flying Objects" by Roger Webb
 "Queen of Hearts" by Juice Newton
 "It's Just a Matter of Time" by Brook Benton
 "Compared to What" by Roberta Flack
 "99 Luftballons" by Nena
 "Voices Carry" by 'Til Tuesday

See also
 The Pornographer
 Wonderland
 Lovelace
 List of films featuring fictional films
 American Eccentric Cinema

Notes

References

External links

 
 
 
 
 
 Paul Thomas Anderson radio interview
 "Livin' Thing: An Oral History of Boogie Nights", Grantland, December 2014

1997 films
1990s buddy comedy-drama films
1997 comedy-drama films
1997 independent films
American comedy-drama films
American independent films
1990s English-language films
Features based on short films
Films about actors
Films about adultery in the United States
Films about drugs
Films about filmmaking
Films about film directors and producers
Films about male prostitution in the United States
Films about pornography
Films about sexuality
Films directed by Paul Thomas Anderson
Films featuring a Best Supporting Actor Golden Globe winning performance
Films scored by Michael Penn
Films set in 1977
Films set in 1978
Films set in 1979
Films set in 1980
Films set in 1981
Films set in 1982
Films set in 1983
Films set in 1984
Films set in the San Fernando Valley
Films shot in California
Films shot in Los Angeles
Films with screenplays by Paul Thomas Anderson
Murder–suicide in films
Uxoricide in fiction
Films set in the 1970s
Films set in the 1980s
New Line Cinema films
1990s American films